Udea affinialis is a moth in the family Crambidae. It was described by Zerny in 1914. It is found in Russia, where it has been recorded from the Sayan Mountains.

References

Moths described in 1914
affinialis